Jonathan Lippert Keltz (born January 17, 1988) is an American actor known for his role as Jake Steinberg in the HBO series Entourage, and his work in the films Prom (2011) and 21 & Over (2013). He starred as Leith Bayard in The CW's series Reign. In May 2014, Keltz was promoted to series regular for the show's second season, which premiered in October 2014.

Background
Keltz was born in New York City, the son of Karin Lippert, who worked in public relations, and Martin Keltz, who is a co-founder of Scholastic Productions.

After moving to Canada with his family, he attended high school at the Northern Secondary School in Toronto, Ontario. His father is of Polish Jewish descent, while his mother is German (born in Hamburg). Keltz was raised in his father's Jewish religion.

Keltz began taking acting classes when he was 10 years old and began working as an actor when he was 16.  In Toronto, he lived in an apartment once occupied by Keanu Reeves.  
Keltz currently lives in Los Angeles, California, while his parents reside in Toronto.

Career
June 1, 2011, Keltz was reported as wrapping filming of the final season of Entourage.  His new projects at that time included the 2011 films Prom, released in April 2011 by Disney, in which he played the role of Brandon Roberts, an oblivious but self-confident teen preparing for his school's prom night, the completed horror film Playback, in which a group of high school students unwittingly unleash an evil spirit that destroys its victims through video playback, and the film Transgression.

Filmography

References

External links
 

1988 births
21st-century American male actors
American male child actors
American male film actors
American male television actors
Jewish American male actors
Living people
Male actors from Los Angeles
Male actors from New York City
American people of German descent
21st-century American Jews